Idmoneidae is a family of bryozoans belonging to the order Cyclostomatida.

Genera:
 Castellia Viskova, 2004
 Idemona Viskova, 2004
 Idemonea Viskova, 2004
 Idmonea Lamouroux, 1821
 Lagonoecia Canu & Bassler, 1920

References

Cyclostomatida